Castello di Cisterna (also Castel Cisterna;) is a comune (municipality) in the Metropolitan City of Naples in the Italian region Campania, located about 15 km northeast of Naples.

Castello di Cisterna borders the following municipalities: Acerra, Brusciano, Pomigliano d'Arco, Somma Vesuviana.

References

External links
 Official website

Cities and towns in Campania